Princess Maria Carolina Ferdinanda of Bourbon-Two Sicilies (29 November 1820 – 14 January 1861) was a princess of the House of Bourbon-Two Sicilies and an infanta of Spain through her marriage to Infante Carlos, Count of Montemolin, Carlist claimant to the throne of Spain under the name Carlos VI. Maria Carolina was a daughter of Francis I of the Two Sicilies and his second wife Maria Isabella of Spain.

Marriage and later life
Maria Carolina married Infante Carlos of Spain, Count of Montemolin, eldest son of Infante Carlos, Count of Molina and his wife Infanta Maria Francisca of Portugal, on 10 July 1850 at Caserta Palace in Caserta, Two Sicilies.

Maria Carolina and her husband died of typhus within a few hours of one another on 14 January 1861 in Trieste. Maria Carolina had contracted the disease from nursing her husband. The couple died without issue. Maria Carolina and Carlos were buried at the Cathedral of St. Just in Trieste.

Ancestry

References

External links
 Floriano Pietrocola, Maria Carolina (1850), Museo del Prado, Madrid
 Reyes Catálogo de la exposición temporal del Museo del Carlismo "Reyes sin trono. Los pretendientes carlistas de 1833 a 1936" (3 abril – 9 diciemb...), p. 41

|-

1820 births
1861 deaths
19th-century Neapolitan people
Princesses of Bourbon-Two Sicilies
Spanish infantas
Spanish countesses
Daughters of kings